The American Nurses Association (ANA) is a 501(c)(6) professional organization to advance and protect the profession of nursing. It started in 1896 as the Nurses Associated Alumnae and was renamed the American Nurses Association in 1911. It is based in Silver Spring, Maryland and Jennifer Mensik Kennedy PhD, RN, NEA-BC, FAAN is the current president.

The ANA states nursing is the protection, promotion, and optimization of health and abilities, prevention of illness and injury, alleviation of suffering through the diagnosis and treatment of human response, and advocacy in the care of individuals, families, communities, and populations.

History
Initial organizational plans were made for the Nurses Associated Alumnae of the United States of America on September 2, 1896 at Manhattan Beach Hotel near New York City.  On February 11–12, 1897 those plans were ratified in Baltimore, Maryland at a meeting that coincided with the annual conference of the American Society of Superintendents of Training Schools for Nurses. Isabel Hampton Robb served as the first president. A major early goal of the organization was the enhancement of nursing care for American soldiers.

ICN was founded in 1899 by nursing organizations from Great Britain, the ANA for the United States, and Germany as charter members. The first ever ICN Congress was held in Buffalo New York in 1901. The next congress to take place in the United States was the Ninth ICN Quadrennial Congress in 1947, hosted by the ANA, at Atlantic City. Attended by over 5,000 delegates representing 250,000 nurses in 32 countries, it was a major step forward in re-establishing international peacetime relations in the healthcare community. ANA leadership made all arrangements including locating lodgings for attendees among local residents, and raising funds to cover travel costs.

In 1970, Mattiedna Johnson spoke at an ANA convention on the lack of representation of African American nurses. She believed it was a major issue which led to the founding of National Black Nurses Association in 1971.

In February 2022, ANA partnered with  Congresswoman Deborah Ross and Congressman Dave Joyce on the  Sexual Assault Nurse Examiners (SANEs) Act, which is designed to address the nation-wide shortage of Sexual Assault Nurse Examiners (SANEs) and improve care for survivors of sexual violence. It bill was also endorsed by RAINN and the National Network to End Domestic Violence.

Primary mission
The association is a professional organization representing registered nurses (RNs) in the United States through its 54 constituent member associations. The ANA is involved in establishing standards of nursing practice, promoting the rights of nurses in the workplace, advancing the economic and general welfare of nurses.

ANA also has three subsidiary organizations: (1) American Academy of Nursing, to serve the public and nursing profession by advancing health policy and practice through the generation, synthesis, and dissemination of nursing knowledge,(2) American Nurses Foundation, the charitable and philanthropic arm, and (3) American Nurses Credentialing Center, which credentials nurses in their specialty and credentials facilities that exhibit nursing excellence.

Publications
American Nurse Today
The American Nurse
OJIN: The Online Journal of Issues in Nursing

Notable members
Katharine Jane Densford, president 1944-48. Densford testified before Congress during World War II regarding wartime nursing recruitment.
Mary Keys Gibson, involved in desegregation efforts in 1948
Helen Maria Roser, nursing educator, worked for ANA's Professional Counseling & Placement Service, 1945 to 1953
M. Elizabeth Shellabarger, Wyoming State Nurses' Association, president
 Vera Blanche Thomas, Arizona State Nurses' Association, president 1927-28

See also
American Association of Legal Nurse Consultants
American Nurses Association Hall of Fame

Notes

References

External links

 
Nursing organizations in the United States
International Council of Nurses
1896 establishments in the United States
Non-profit organizations based in Maryland